The Tides of Fate is a 1917 American silent drama film directed by Marshall Farnum and starring William Sheer and Charles E. Graham. Location shooting took place in Cuba.

Cast
 Alexandria Carlisle as Fanny Lawson 
 Frank Holland as John Cross 
 William Sheer as Stephen King 
 Charles E. Graham as Fergus McManus 
 Jane Kent as Claudia Nelson 
 Walter Ryder as Azray Heath

References

Bibliography
 Brent E. Walker. Mack Sennett’s Fun Factory: A History and Filmography of His Studio and His Keystone and Mack Sennett Comedies, with Biographies of Players and Personnel. McFarland, 2013.

External links
 

1917 films
1917 drama films
1910s English-language films
American silent feature films
Silent American drama films
Films directed by Marshall Farnum
American black-and-white films
World Film Company films
1910s American films